The 1958 Wichita Shockers football team, sometimes known as the Wheatshockers, was an American football team that represented Wichita  University (now known as Wichita State University) as a member of the Missouri Valley Conference during the 1958 NCAA University Division football season. In its second season under head coach Woody Woodard, the team compiled a 4–5–1 record (1–2–1 against conference opponents), finished in last place out of five teams in the MVC, and was outscored by a total of 200 to 148. The team played its home games at Veterans Field, now known as Cessna Stadium.

Schedule

References

Wichita
Wichita State Shockers football seasons
Wichita Shockers football